Tove Kohala (born 29 January 2001) is a Swedish luger who competes internationally.
 
She represented her country at the 2022 Winter Olympics.

Her father, Hans, competed in the luge doubles event at the 1992 and 1994 Winter Olympics. Her brother, Svante, also competed at the 2022 Winter Olympics in the men's singles event in luge.

References

External links
 
 
 

2001 births
Living people
Swedish female lugers
Olympic lugers of Sweden
Lugers at the 2016 Winter Youth Olympics
Lugers at the 2022 Winter Olympics